Mirror symmetry may refer to:

Mirror symmetry (string theory), a relation between two Calabi–Yau manifolds in string theory
Homological mirror symmetry, a mathematical conjecture about Calabi–Yau manifolds made by Maxim Kontsevich
Mirror symmetry conjecture, a mathematical conjecture about mirror symmetry 
P-symmetry, symmetry under parity inversion
Reflection symmetry, which mirror symmetry is a synonym for
Mirror-symmetry breaking